Gary R. Mormino is an American historian, author, frequent contributor to the Tampa Bay Times, the Frank E. Duckwall Professor of History Emeritus, and past director of the Florida Studies Program at the University of South Florida St. Petersburg. Mormino graduated with a Ph.D. from the University of North Carolina at Chapel Hill and has taught at USF since 1977. In 2003, the Florida Humanities Council named him its first Humanist of the Year.

Mormino's books include Land of Sunshine, State of Dreams: A Social History of Modern Florida, published in 2005 by the University Press of Florida; Immigrants on the Hill (University of Illinois Press, 1986), winner of the Howard R. Marraro Prize as the outstanding book in Italian history; and The Immigrant World of Ybor City (University of Illinois Press, 1987), honored with the Theodore Saloutos Prize as an outstanding book in ethnic immigration history.

Mormino has also written for The Tampa Tribune, The Orlando Sentinel, and The Miami Herald.

In 2014, Mormino received the Florida Lifetime Achievement Award for Writing.

References

External links
 Icon: Gary Mormino at Florida Trend
 The Gilded Age in Florida at CMF Public Media

Year of birth missing (living people)
Living people
20th-century American non-fiction writers
21st-century American non-fiction writers
21st-century American historians
American male journalists
University of North Carolina at Chapel Hill alumni
University of South Florida faculty
20th-century American male writers
21st-century American male writers